Andrew Campbell  (died 1769) was an Irish Roman Catholic prelate who served as the Bishop of Kilmore from 1753 to 1769.

He was appointed the Bishop of the Diocese of Kilmore by Pope Benedict XIV on 3 April 1753.

Bishop Campbell died in office on 23 December 1769.

Notes

References

 
 

Year of birth unknown
1769 deaths
18th-century Roman Catholic bishops in Ireland
Roman Catholic bishops of Kilmore